Klára Cahynová (born 20 December 1993) is a Czech professional footballer who plays as a midfielder for Spanish Liga F club Sevilla FC and the Czech Republic women's national team.

Career
Cahynová first played the Czech First Division in Slovácko. She made her debut for the national team on 3 June 2011 in a friendly match against Nigeria, and that summer she signed for Slavia Prague, with which she first played the UEFA Champions League, reaching the quarterfinals. In the 2017–18 winter transfer window she moved to Turbine Potsdam in the German Bundesliga. In the 2021–22 summer transfer window she moved to Sevilla FC in the Spanish Primera División.

Titles
 Czech First Division (4): 2013–14, 2014–15, 2015–16, 2016–17.
 Czech Cup (2): 2013–14, 2015–16.

References

1993 births
Living people
Czech women's footballers
Czech expatriate women's footballers
Czech Republic women's international footballers
1. FC Slovácko (women) players
Expatriate women's soccer players in the United States
Czech expatriate sportspeople in the United States
Sportspeople from Zlín
University of Northwestern Ohio alumni
1. FFC Turbine Potsdam players
Expatriate women's footballers in Germany
Czech expatriate sportspeople in Germany
Frauen-Bundesliga players
Women's association football midfielders
SK Slavia Praha (women) players
Czech Women's First League players
Sevilla FC (women) players
Expatriate women's footballers in Spain
Czech expatriate sportspeople in Spain